Maize chlorotic dwarf virus (MCDV) is a plant pathogenic virus of the family Sequiviridae.

External links
 ICTVdB – The Universal Virus Database: Maize chlorotic dwarf virus
 Family Groups – The Baltimore Method

Viral plant pathogens and diseases
Secoviridae